Meham, also spelled Maham, is a small city in Rohtak district of the Indian state of Haryana. It is one of the two sub-divisions in Rohtak district. As a tehsil, it is further divided into two community development blocks, Maham and Lakhan-Majra.

Geography 
It has an average elevation of 214 metres (702 feet).
Situated on Indian National Highway 9, it is a major stop between the cities Delhi and Sirsa in the Haryana state of India.

Demographics 
Maham town is situated in the Rohtak district of Haryana, a main subdivision of the Rohtak district in its west, thirty kilometers from the city of Rohtak. It has its own municipality and a constituency for the Haryana Legislative Assembly. There are about 30 villages in Maham. Furthermore, has its own Mini Secretariat situated on Rohtak Road in the eastern part of the city.

The 2001 Indian census reported that Maham had a population of 18,166. Males constitute 54% of the population; females, 46%. Maham has an average literacy rate of 66%, higher than the national average of 59.5%: male literacy is 72%, and female literacy is 59%. 15% of the population is under six years of age. Its entire urban area had a population of 20,483. 10,817 are males; 9,661 are females; and 5 are others.

Indus Valley Civilization sites 
There are large sand dunes about five kilometers away on the city's western fringe. In ancient times, the area's name was Mahahattam. About two big ponds and a dozen smaller ones were created by the Indus Valley civilisation to trap runoff rainwater in them, which could last for a full year until the next rainfall replenished the supply. There are a few myths of that culture that concern the area of Maham. Archaeological excavations in the region on land about the area of a dozen village estates have yielded well-documented finds, which have shed light on the pre-Harappan settlements, particularly at Madina and Farmana Khas. Dr. Vasant Shinde of the Deccan College in Pune, Dr. Manmohan Singh of Maharshi Dayanand University in Rohtak, and other Japanese scientists explored these archaeological finds.

Early history 

Maham suffered a setback during the invasion of the Ghaznavids under the command of Sultan Mahmud (lived 971 – 1030 AD) and later when his son Mas'ud I (998 – 1040 AD) sacked the town. A few centuries later, during the reign of the Turkic Muslim ruler Firuz Shah Tughlaq (1309 – 1388 AD), the town was resettled, and agricultural operations resumed.

Maham during Mughal rule 
Maham was a thriving town during the Mughal Empire.

Maham Fort 
The Mughals posted a garrison commander at Maham and built a small fort that is now in complete ruins except for its ramparts.

Shahjahan ki Baoli 
Shahjahan ki Baoli, colloquially known as Choro ki Baoli (thieves' stepwell) and Jyani Chor ki Surang (Jayani the thief's tunnel), was built from 1558 to 1559 CE by Mughal courtier Saidu Kalal during the reign of Shah Jahan (reigned 1628 – 1658 CE). It is an old Baoli (stepwell) made of lakhori bricks with 101 steps. Several rooms in the subterranean pavilion flank both sides of the well's steps. Now it lies in partial ruins and faces neglect.

Mosques 
Two masjids (mosques), Jama Masjid and Pirzada Masjid, were built during the Mughal era and are currently in ruins. Parts of them have been demolished by the villagers and used for making, drying and storing hand-made dried cow dung cakes (called Uple उपले in Hindi and Gosse गोस्से in Haryanvi) or as fuel in Chulha (stoves) for cooking.

Tomb of Shah Muhammad Ramzan Mahami and Shah Ghulam Hussain Mahami (Takht Walay) 
The tombs of Shah Muhammad Ramzan Mahami and Shah Ghulam Hussain Mahami (Takht Walay) of Mughal times are both in partial ruins. That of the latter, a Muslim saint, has been partially restored by locals. Religious structures have been erected near it.

Maham during British Raj 
Maham had a considerable Muslim population before the partition of India after Independence from the UK. The partition led to a mass exodus of Muslims of the peoples of the Pathan, Baloch and Moola Jats migrated to the newly formed Muslim nation of Pakistan in 1947. Now, Maham is mostly a Hindu town.

Transport 
The small city is well-connected to all nearby cities through bus transport although there is no connectivity for railways. In the Railway Budget of 2012 and 2013, the government of India approved railway lines connecting Rohtak and Hansi, which also provides transportation for Maham. There is a proposal to establish a cargo airport at Maham, approved by Aviation Minister Ajit Singh. Because Maham is located near National Highway 9 and Delhi, it is a popular place for businesses.

Recreation 
There is a spacious and crowded park named Huda Park. There is also a stadium for playing games. The government high school, New Anaj Mandi; Sisar/Bhiwani Road; Kheri/Gohana Road; and Hissar Road are popular among morning walkers.

Temples 
There are a few Hindu Temples and traditional mansions called havelis owned by Seth Mai Dayal Namberdar family are 125 years old. Seth Mai Dayal Namberdar was the biggest landlord of Meham having 5000 bigha  land. He was a great social person and donated land for Municipal committee, for civil hospital, for school , for veterinary hospital etc.
 for A famous ancient temple named Radha Krishan Temple is situated outside of the old bus stand in Chintala Mohalla, ward No. 6 & 8. It has a statue of Krishna made of rare black stone.

In  a kilometer away from the Meham city near Kishan Garh, there is a 400 year (Near About 1630 AD to 1635 AD) old temple named Shri Dadi Sati Mandir. People from the Aggarwal (Garg Gotra) community come here to receive blessings. Also, Mundan ceremonies are organised by families there. It is located at the Meham–Behlba road. Near Baba Rupa Talab.

There is also a temple named Sheetalpuri Mandir, which is about 500 years old, in the centre of Maham.

In Bharan, a village near Maham, an annual religious festival celebrating Goga Navmi is held in the Goga Ji temple, and wrestling (Kushti/Kabbati) tournaments are organized nearby.

Five kilometers away from Maham, a large village named Behlba contains an old temple named Baba Khali Nath Temple.

Other temples include Darbari Mal Mandir, Geeta Bhawan, Radha Krishna Mandir (Sant ka Mandir) at Kaglon ka Mohalla, Khari Kui Mandir and Khangah Mandir. Furthermore, the temples Shani Mandir and Kali Devi Mandir were recently established.

References 

Cities and towns in Rohtak district
Forts in Haryana
Archaeological sites in Haryana
Tourist attractions in Haryana
Rebuilt buildings and structures in India